Seyyed Ahmad Adib Pishavari, also known as Sayyed Ahmad B. Sehab al-Din Razawi (1844 – 30 June 1930), was a Sufi scholar who born in or near Peshawar in modern-day Pakistan, and was descended from Omar Sohravardi. Adib was a master of Persian literature. 

When Adib was a young man, the border wars between the British and the Afghan tribes resulted in the deaths of his father and many other relatives. For this reason, Adib relocated to Kabul and later Ghazni to complete his early education. He moved to Iran in 1877 and enroled at the madrasa of Molla Hadi Sabzevari in Sabzavr, where he was exposed to advanced philosophical lectures. Having lost his father and relatives as a result of British wars, Adib Pishavari was a critic of British colonial policies in Iran and the region, which he deemed "evil"; in his writings, Adib likened the United Kingdom to an "old fox", an "ominous raven", and a "venomous viper".

Early life and education 
According to some, Adib Pishavari was born in a mountain village between Afghanistan and Peshawar, British India, while others say he was born in Peshawar. His father Seyyed Shah Baba and his predecessors were Sufiya nobility. After Adib's father was killed by the British, he moved to Kabul and then Ghaznin, where he learnt etiquette and wisdom.

Adib went to Mashhad to complete his education, and then attended Hadi Sabzavari in Sabzevar for his final two years of schooling. In 1921, Adib moved to Tehran at the suggestion of Saeed Khan Garmroudi, the Iranian foreign minister in charge of Astan Quds. Adib never married; he remained in Tehran until his death in 1930, and was interred in Ray, Iran.

Works and ideologies 
Adib Pishavari is one of the most important writers of his time due to his extensive knowledge of science, his competence in Persian and Arabic, and his exceptional recall. His poetic collection contains approximately 20,000 couplets. The collection, which was released three years after his death, consists mainly of ghazals and qasidas, and has 370 Arabic and 4,200 Persian verses. In addition, he wrote Qaysarnama, a protracted mathnavi honouring Kaiser Wilhelm II and praising Germany's participation in World War I. Despite being a member of an older generation of poets, Adib supported fresh social and political perspectives, as did his younger contemporaries. Adib thus contributed to the development of nationalistic impulses in Persian poetry.

Adib's father and his numerous relatives were killed during fighting between British forces and Afghan tribes. In his works, Adib likened the United Kingdom to animals, such as "old fox", "ominous raven", and "venomous viper" to criticise British colonial policies in Iran and the region, which he deemed "evil". The epithet "old fox" for the UK continues to be popular in Iran. One of  Adib's poems reads:

See also 
 Muhammad Iqbal

References 

1844 births
1930 deaths
Persian-language poets
Pakistani poets